René Thirifays (8 October 1920–17 October 1986) was a Belgian football player who finished top scorer of the Belgian League with 26 goals in 1949 while playing for Sporting Charleroi.  He played 13 times with the Belgium national team between 1946 and 1949.  Thirifays made his international debut on 23 February 1946 in a 7–0 friendly win against Luxembourg.

References

1920 births
1986 deaths
Belgian footballers
R. Charleroi S.C. players
Belgium international footballers
Belgian Pro League players
Association football forwards